Sandwich printing is a non-digital photographic technique which combines two negatives or transparencies into a single image.

Procedure  
"Sandwiching" may be accomplished by putting one original image on top of the other, placing them into the film carrier of an enlarger, and printing on one sheet of paper. It may also be accomplished by placing the two "sandwiched" originals in a frame on the surface of a lightbox and taking a third photograph of the combination. Sandwich printing is generally used to create a combination of image elements that would not occur naturally in the world. This technique may be used with either black and white or color images.

When film negatives are used, one image will appear in the shadows of the other image. This occurs as a result of the shadow areas being less dense than the highlighted areas of a negative. The more underexposed the shadows, the more clearly the image from the other negative will shine through. The opposite occurs when using transparencies. The darker area of one image appears in the highlighted and pale areas of the other image.

See also 
 Multiple exposure

References 

Digital photography
Photographic techniques